Khost City Ground  is a multi-purpose stadium in Khost, Afghanistan, used for football and other sports. The ground was inaugurated in 2011.

The stadium cost more than one million dollars and it was hoped that the facility would help promote peace in the region. The stadium was constructed in three years with financial support from the Afghanistan National Olympic Committee.

The stadium has race tracks, volleyball and basketball courts, as well as a cricket ground, on 7.5 acres of land. It has capacity for 18,000 spectators.

, Germany is helping build a new cricket stadium, Khost Cricket Stadium, with €700,000 financial assistance. It will be the fourth cricket facility in the country and is being constructed on 25 acres of land with a capacity of 6,000 people.

References

External links
 Wikimapia.org
 espncricinfo

Cricket grounds in Afghanistan
2011 establishments in Afghanistan
Khost Province